The Storm House is a historic house located at 721 W. Broadway in Elk City, Oklahoma.

Description and history 
The house was built in 1930 for the locally significant Storm family. Architect P. A. Engwall designed the house in the Spanish Colonial Revival style. The walls of the house are stucco, and its roof is covered in red clay tiles. The front porch is arcaded, while a second-floor porch features a wooden balustrade and brackets. The house's library, which projects from the end of the second floor, is shaped like a Spanish ship and features an oriel window.

The house was added to the National Register of Historic Places on October 6, 1983.

References

Houses on the National Register of Historic Places in Oklahoma
Spanish Colonial Revival architecture in Oklahoma
Houses completed in 1930
Houses in Beckham County, Oklahoma
National Register of Historic Places in Beckham County, Oklahoma